The Nanxi River, also known as the Nậm Thi River in Vietnamese or Namiti, is a tributary of the Red River located in China's Yunnan province. It is a border river of Lào Cai, Vietnam, and Hekou, China.

It flows generally north to south from Mengzi to Hekou, where it joins the Red River and flows into Vietnam. 

The Chinese portion of the Yunnan–Vietnam Railway was built partly along the Nanxi River valley from 1906 to 1910, linking the city of Kunming with the Vietnamese capital, Hanoi.
The mountainous terrain of the Nanxi River Valley posed special difficulties for the railway's construction; this, along with the endemic nature of malaria in the area, led to the deaths of at least 10,000 workers in the valley. Today, the Nanxi River is known as a destination for white water rafting.

References

Rivers of Yunnan
Rivers of Lào Cai province
International rivers of Asia
Geography of Honghe Hani and Yi Autonomous Prefecture
Rivers of Vietnam